Ranjit Patil (born 20 January 1964) is a member of Maharashtra Legislative Council, belonging to the Bharatiya Janata Party and was State General Secretary Maharashtra Unit. He represents the Amravati graduate constituency. He was appointed Maharashtra's Minister of State in December, 2014 with the portfolio Home (Urban), Urban Development, General Administration, Law and Judiciary and Parliamentary Affairs. Later in the same month, he was also given responsibility of being guardian minister of Akola district and Washim district. He has completed 2 terms as an MLC and is now running for a 3rd consecutive term.

Early life
Patil was born to Sulochanadevi Patil and Vitthalrao Patil, who was then a member of Maharashtra Legislative Council from Akola.

Education and early career
Patil also has a post-graduate degree in MBBS and MS (Ortho) from Government Medical College, Nagpur. He is a leading Orthopedic surgeon in Akola at Vitthal hospital. He is well known for the same in the neighbouring districts as well.

Family and personal life
Ranjit Patil is second in age among the four brothers. All his brothers are well qualified. His elder brother Rajendra Patil is principal of a  renowned college of Akola, His younger brother Randhir Patil is a prominent business man of Akola, his youngest brother 
Nitin Patil is one of the most successful farmers of the district.

Political career

Positions held

Within BJP

 Vice President, Medical Wing Maharashtra BJP (2007-2012)
 President, Medical Wing Akola BJP
 Prabhari, West Vidarbha (Medical Wing)
General Secretary, BJP, Maharashtra (2012)

Legislative

Member, Maharashtra Legislative Council

References

Members of the Maharashtra Legislative Council
Living people
People from Akola district
1964 births
People from Akola
Bharatiya Janata Party politicians from Maharashtra